Cellvibrio zantedeschiae is a Gram-negative, strictly aerobic and motile  bacterium from the genus of Cellvibrio which has been isolated from the roots of the plant Zantedeschia aethiopica from Taiwan.

References

Pseudomonadales
Bacteria described in 2017